1952 Tokachi earthquake
1973 Nemuro earthquake
1982 Urakawa earthquake
1993 Kushiro earthquake
 1993 Okushiri earthquake
1994 Kuril Islands earthquake
 2003 Tokachi earthquake
 2018 Hokkaido Eastern Iburi earthquake